Julio Giacomo Bonetti (July 14, 1911 – June 17, 1952) was a right-handed pitcher in Major League Baseball for the St. Louis Browns and Chicago Cubs. He is one of only seven Italian-born Major League Baseball players in history.

Bonetti made his major league debut with the Browns on April 22, 1937. He became a versatile pitcher for the lowly Browns that season, pitching in 12 games out of the bullpen (notching one save) and starting 16 others, seven of which he completed. He managed just a 4–11 record and a 5.84 ERA, but his ERA was actually better than the last-place team's average of 6.00.

Nevertheless, in 1938 Bonetti pitched exclusively in relief, going 2–3 with a 6.35 ERA in 17 games. His contract was purchased by the Cubs in February 1939, and after some time in the minors, Bonetti worked his way onto the Cubs roster in April 1940. Unfortunately, his Cub debut, which came three years to the day after his major league debut, was disastrous. Bonetti allowed three runs on three hits and four walks in just 1 innings for an ERA of 20.25. He never pitched in the major leagues again.

Bonetti died June 17, 1952, in Belmont, California, after suffering a heart attack.

References

External links

1911 births
1952 deaths
Chicago Cubs players
Des Moines Demons players
Los Angeles Angels (minor league) players
Major League Baseball pitchers
Major League Baseball players from Italy
Mission Reds players
San Antonio Missions players
St. Louis Browns players
Sportspeople from Genoa
Rock Island Islanders players
Toledo Mud Hens players